

History 

The Junior Professional Football Club was founded on March 19, 1980. The most famous player is Zizi Roberts and it won in 1996 the Liberian Premier League.

Honors
Liberian Premier League: 1
 1996

Liberian Cup: 1
 1996

 
Football clubs in Liberia
1980 establishments in Liberia
Association football clubs established in 1980